The English School (TES) officially known as the 'Colegio de Inglaterra' is a private school and is owned and managed by the Fundación Educativa de Inglaterra (FEI) Bogotá, Colombia. It offers the International Baccalaureate programme: including the IB Primary Years Programme (PYP), IB Middle Years Programme (MYP) and IB Diploma Programme (DP) alongside the Colombian Prueba Saber. Learning and teaching take place in the English, Spanish and French languages.

The school was founded by Elisabeth Masson in 1961 to offer a bilingual (Spanish) and English education to Colombians, as well as to the children of English-speaking foreign residents of Colombia from the UK, the U.S., and other nations. The English School takes accreditation with the European Framework for Quality Management (EFQM) for which it received 5-star accreditation in November 2019 and the Council of International Schools (CIS). 

The school is divided into four levels: Preschool (ages 4–7), Primary School (ages 8–11), Middle School (ages 11–16) and Upper School (ages 16–18). 

The school is an active member of the following: Asociación Andina de Colegios BI (AACBI) which was founded at The English School, Latin American Heads Association (LAHC), Round Square, Search Associates, The Hague International Model United Nations (THIMUN), Future We Want Model United Nations (FWWMUN), KIVA, UNCOLI. The UNCOLI is a local organisation of international schools in Bogotá. They are the governing body of all inter-school competitions and provide organisational support for sporting, academic and artistic events among the schools.

TESMUN is the English School's Model United Nations.

Sports 
In 2018-19 the English School won the overall trophies for the AACBI Cup and the British School of Barranquilla Games.
The school belongs to the UNCOLI (Union of International Schools in Bogotá) Association.[8] Students are encouraged to participate in sport from a young age, especially in football, basketball, volleyball, and track and field competitions. Competitive tournaments with other UNCOLI schools are available in the following age categories:
 Mayores (Grades 11 and 10)
 Juvenil (Grades 9 and 8)
 Infantil (Grades 7 and 6)
 Pre-Infantil (Grades 5 and 4)
 Benjamines (Grade 3, non-sanctioned)
The school is divided into houses for internal competitions. Houses are chosen randomly at the grade of kindergarten; there are four different houses: Lion, Phoenix, Unicorn and Dragon.

Notable alumni 
 Manuel Teodoro -  Journalist and host in Séptimo día

References

External links

 

International Baccalaureate schools in Colombia
International schools in Colombia
Educational institutions established in 1961
Bilingual schools
Schools in Bogotá
1961 establishments in Colombia